The 1922 Cork Senior Hurling Championship was the 34th staging of the Cork Senior Hurling Championship since its establishment by the Cork County Board in 1887. It was the first championship to be played since 1920 because of the Anglo-Irish War.

Blackrock were the defending champions.

St. Finbarr’s won the championship following a walkover from Blackrock in the final. This was their sixth championship title overall and their first title in three years.

Results

Semi-finals

Final

References

Cork Senior Hurling Championship
Cork Senior Hurling Championship